Hogwash is a 1972 album recorded by The Groundhogs, originally released by United Artists Records in 1972, catalogue number UAG 29419. The most recent CD reissue is that of 2008 by BGO Records, catalogue number BGOCD787.

Music

The sound of Hogwash has been classified as progressive rock, and it draws from elements of psychedelic music, space rock and blues.

Tony McPhee was one of the earliest rock guitarists to experiment with guitar controlled synthesis and Oberheim/Maestro ring modulators.  On this album he used a Hagstrom guitar synthesizer, a simple controller for an ARP 2600.  The Hagstrom was monophonic and had resistors soldered on at each fret to create a monophonic control voltage bus and trigger gate.  This allowed the guitar sound to be doubled, (but not bent by string pulls) and also required the analog synth to hold its tuning over the entire range. The album closes with a tribute to John Lee Hooker.

Track listing

All tracks composed by Tony McPhee
 "I Love Miss Ogyny" – 5:20
 "You Had a Lesson" – 5:45
 "The Ringmaster" – 1:25
 "3744 James Road"  – 7:15
 "Sad is the Hunter" – 5:15
 "S'One Song" – 3:40
 "Earth Shanty" – 6:50
 "Mr Hooker, Sir John" – 3:34

Personnel
Tony McPhee - guitars, keyboards, vocals
Peter Cruikshank - bass
Clive Brooks - drums
Martin Rushent - engineer

References 

1972 albums
The Groundhogs albums
United Artists Records albums